A list of films produced in France in 1935:

See also
 1935 in France

References

External links
 French films of 1935 at the Internet Movie Database
French films of 1935 at Cinema-francais.fr

1935
Films
Lists of 1935 films by country or language